Thekkur is a village in the Orathanadu taluk of Thanjavur district, Tamil Nadu, India.

Demographics 

As per the 2001 census, Thekkur had a total population of 5503 with 2692 males and 2811 females. The sex ratio was 1044. The literacy rate was 70.24.

one higher secondary school and one elementary school is there.

References 

 

Villages in Thanjavur district